The Takbir ("magnification [of God]") is the name for the Arabic phrase , meaning "God is the greatest".

It is a common Arabic expression, used in various contexts by Muslims and Arabs around the world: in formal Salah (prayer), in the Adhan (Islamic call to prayer), in Hajj, as an informal expression of faith, in times of distress or joy, or to express resolute determination or defiance. The phrase is also used by Arab Christians. It is also used as war cry by terrorist groups.

Exegesis
The Arabic word  means big from the Semitic root . The Arabic word  is the elative form (biggest) of the adjective kabīr. When used in the  it is usually translated as biggest, but some authors translate it as bigger. The term  itself is the stem II verbal noun of the triliteral root , meaning "big", from which akbar "bigger" is derived. The form  is the nominative of Allah, meaning 'God'.

Usage in Islamic rituals

This phrase is recited by Muslims in many different situations. For example, when they are very happy, to express approval, to prevent a Muslim from becoming prideful by reminding them that Allah is their source of success, as a battle cry, or during times of extreme stress. The phrase is not found in the Quran, which does not describe God as akbar, but uses the name al-Kabīr "The Great" or Kabīr "Great", commonly translated as "Most Great" (13:9, 31:30, 22:62, 34:23, 40:12, 4:34).

In prayer
The phrase is said during each stage of both salah (obligatory prayers, performed five times a day), and nafl (supererogatory prayers, performed at will). The call to prayer by the muezzin to those outside the mosque (adhan) and the call to those inside to line up for the commencement of prayer (iqama) also contain the phrase.

While there are many short prayers like it, the takbir is used more frequently than any other.

Following births and deaths 
The phrase is used after the birth of a child as a means of praising God. It is also part Islamic funeral and burial customs.

During the Eid Festival and the Hajj 
During the festival of Eid al-Adha and the days preceding it, Muslims recite the Takbīr. This is particularly the case on the Day of Arafah.

During the halal slaughter of animals
The process of pronouncing the name of Allah while performing Dhabihah one must say "Bismillah Allahu Akbar".

Other social usage

The expression "Allah Akbar" can be used in a variety of situations, from celebrations to times of grief.

In a historical account by someone who was present both at the birth of Abd Allah ibn al-Zubayr and at his funeral, the author observes that "Allahu Akbar" was said on both occasions.

In times of distress
The phrase is sometimes used during distress.

Just before Garuda Indonesia Flight 152 crashed into the jungle near Medan, Indonesia, the pilot screamed "Aaaaaaah! Allāhu akbar" into his radio. According to a radio communication transcript, the pilot's conversation with the air controller had been in English, but his last words as the plane crashed were the takbir.

In times of joy and gratitude 
The takbir can be used to express joy or surprise. It is also used as applause in religious contexts, such as after a Quran recital, as other forms of applause are considered less appropriate.

When Reshma Begum was discovered alive 17 days after the 2013 Savar building collapse in Bangladesh which killed 1129 people, crowds jubilantly cried "Allāhu akbar" to express their joy and gratitude that she had survived.

As a multi-purpose phrase, it is sometimes used by Arab football commentators as an expression of amazement, or even as a football chant.

In battle 
Historically, the takbir has been used as a cry of victory. Ibn Ishaq's Life of Mohammed narrates at least two incidents in which it was so used.

"When the apostle raided a people he waited until the morning. If he heard a call to prayer he held back; if he did not hear it he attacked. We came to Khaybar by night, and the apostle passed the night there; and when morning came he did not hear the call to prayer, so he rode and we rode with him, and I rode behind Abu Talha with my foot touching the apostle's foot. We met the workers of Khaybar coming out in the morning with their spades and baskets. When they saw the apostle and the army they cried, 'Muhammad with his force,' and turned tail and fled. The apostle said, 'Allah akbar! Khaybar is destroyed. When we arrive in a people's square it is a bad morning for those who have been warned.'" (page 511) "So he got off his horse and came at him and 'Ali advanced with his shield. 'Amr aimed a blow which cut deeply into the shield so that the sword stuck in it and struck his head. But 'Ali gave him a blow on the vein at the base of the neck and he fell to the ground. The dust rose and the apostle heard the cry, 'Allah Akbar' and knew that 'Ali had killed him." (page 456)

In protest
During the Iranian Revolution of 1979, it was shouted from rooftops in Iran during the evenings as a form of protest. This practice returned in the 2009 Iranian presidential election protests, which protested the election results.

Usage by extremists and terrorists 
The phrase has sometimes been used as a battle cry by Muslim extremists. This usage has been denounced by other Muslims.

Professor Khaled A. Beydoun writes that the association of the phrase "Allah Akbar" with terrorism has been exacerbated by mass media and television pundits. He points out that fictional films and shows also utilize it as a cinematic trope further cementing the association.

Usage by Christians 
The phrase is also used by Arabic-speaking Christians, "God" being translated "Allah" in Arabic. The phrase is used in liturgical contexts among Palestinian Orthodox Christians, and its use has been defended by Theodosios, the Palestinian Orthodox Archbishop of Sebastia.

Use on flags

Afghanistan
The Afghan constitution that came into force on January 4, 2004, required that Allāhu akbar be inscribed on the Flag of the Islamic Republic of Afghanistan.  Afghanistan came under Taliban control following the 2021 offensive, and the Islamic Republic collapsed.

Iran
The phrase Allāhu akbar is written on the flag of Iran, as called for by Article 18 of the Constitution of the Islamic Republic of Iran. The phrase appears 22 times on the flag, written on the borders of the central white stripe.

Iraq
The phrase Allāhu akbar is written on the center of the flag of Iraq.

During the Gulf War in January 1991, Saddam Hussein held a meeting with top military commanders, where it was decided to add the words Allāhu akbar (described as the Islamic battle cry) to Iraq's flag to boost his secular regime's religious credentials, casting himself as the leader of an Islamic army.  Hussein described the flag as "the banner of jihad and monotheism".

In 2004, the US-picked Iraqi Governing Council approved a new flag for Iraq that abandoned symbols of Hussein's regime, such as the words Allāhu akbar. In January 2008, however, Iraq's parliament passed a law to change the flag by leaving in the phrase, but changing the calligraphy of the words Allāhu akbar, which had been a copy of Hussein's handwriting, to a Kufic script. The Iraqi flag under Hussein had each of the two words of the phrase written in one of the spaces between the stars on the central band; the 2008 flag, while leaving the phrase in, removes the stars.

Other uses
A resistance movement that fought British rule in Waziristan, Pakistan, used a red flag bearing Allāhu akbar in white letters.

See also
Dhikr
Tasbih
Tahmid
Tahlil
Tasmiyah
Salawat
Shahada
Hallelujah
Hallel
Alláh-u-Abhá
Deo optimo maximo

Notes

References

Books

External links

 Essay on the takbir at Slate

Arabic words and phrases
Battle cries
Islamic terminology
Superlatives in religion
Religious formulas